Coffee Prince may refer to:

 Coffee Prince (2007 TV series), a 2007 South Korean television series
 Coffee Prince, a 2012 Thai remake aired on TrueVisions
 Coffee Prince (2012 TV series), a 2012 Filipino remake
 My Coffee Prince, a 2017 Malaysian remake aired on Astro Ria
 Prince Coffee Lab, a 2018 Chinese remake aired on QQLive